One Life is a 2011 British nature documentary film directed by Michael Gunton and Martha Holmes. The film is narrated by the British actor Daniel Craig.

Release
One Life premiered on 22 July 2011 in the United Kingdom. The film had a limited release in the United States in February 2013.

Reception
On review aggregator Rotten Tomatoes, the film holds an approval rating of 90% based on 21 reviews, with an average rating of 6.85/10. On Metacritic, the film has a weighted average score of 68 out of 100, based on 9 critics, indicating "generally favorable reviews".

For his narration, Craig was nominated for the Primetime Emmy Award for Outstanding Narrator.

References

External links
 IM global : Life
 
 

2011 films
2011 documentary films
BBC Film films
Documentary films about nature
Films scored by George Fenton
Films directed by Mike Gunton
Films directed by Martha Holmes
British independent films
Films about animals
Films about cats
2010s English-language films
2010s British films